is a funicular station located in Yawata, Kyoto Prefecture, Japan, on the Keihan Electric Railway Cable Line (Iwashimizu-Hachimangū Cable).

Layout
The station has 2 dead end platforms on the sides of a track, one platform is usually used for getting on and off while the other is used for getting off only during crowded seasons. There is no ticket machine or ticket gates, so that passengers must pay the fare for the Cable Car after getting off at Cable-hachimangū-guchi Station.

Adjacent stations

References

Railway stations in Kyoto Prefecture
Stations of Keihan Electric Railway
Railway stations in Japan opened in 1955